Scythris carboniella is a moth of the family Scythrididae. It was described by Jäckh in 1978. It is found in France, Italy, North Macedonia and former Yugoslavia.

References

carboniella
Moths described in 1978